This is a list of ingredients found in Korean cuisine.

Meat

Grains

Fruits

See also  	 
 Korean cuisine

References

Pettid, Michael J., Korean Cuisine: An Illustrated History, London: Reaktion Books Ltd., 2008.

External links
 

Ingredients